The 1990–91 Liga Nacional de Fútbol Femenino was the third season of the Spanish women's football top tier. Oiartzun achieved their first title ever.

Teams and locations

League table

References
Arquero Arba
RSSSF

Primera División (women) seasons
1990–91 in Spanish football leagues
1990–91 in Spanish women's football